The Citroën DS3 R5 is a R5 rally car built by Citroën Racing, based upon the Citroën DS3 road car. The car made its WRC debut at the 2014 Rally Italia Sardegna.

References

External links

 
 Citroën DS3 R5 at eWRC-results.com

All-wheel-drive vehicles
DS3 R5
R5 cars